This article contains information about the literary events and publications of 1529.

Events
Paracelsus starts to write Paragranum.

New books
Henry Cornelius Agrippa – 
Simon Fish – A Supplicacyon for the Beggers
Hans Luft – A Proper Dialogue Between A Gentleman and a Husbandman
Martin Luther
Luther's Small Catechism
On War Against the Turk
Philipp Melanchthon – Commentary on the Colossians (with foreword by Martin Luther)
Thomas More – A Supplication of Souls
John Rastell – The Pastyme of People, the Chronydes of dyvers Realmys and most specially of the Realme of England

Births
February 23 – Onofrio Panvinio, Italian historian and antiquary (died 1568)
June 7 – Étienne Pasquier, French poet and author (died 1615)
December 11 – Fulvio Orsini, Italian humanist historian (died 1600)
Unknown date – George Puttenham, English writer and critic (died 1590)

Deaths
February 2 – Baldassare Castiglione, Italian poet and author (born 1478)
June 21 – John Skelton, English poet (born c. 1460)
Unknown dates
Richard Pynson, French-born English printer (born 1448)
Paulus Aemilius Veronensis, Italian historian (born c. 1455)

References

Years of the 16th century in literature